The men's +100 kg competition in judo at the 2022 Mediterranean Games was held on 1 July at the Mohammed Ben Ahmed Convention Centre in Oran.

Results

Main bracket

Repechage

References

External links
 

M101
2022